"Sophisticated Lady" is a jazz standard.

Sophisticated Lady may also refer to:
Sophisticated Lady (Ella Fitzgerald and Joe Pass album)
Sophisticated Lady (Julie London album)

See also
Sophisticated Lady (She's a Different Lady), a song originally recorded by R&B artist Natalie Cole